"Mala" is the first single from Yolandita's 31st studio album, Mala. This song was written by Maria Isabel Saavedra and produced by Jose Luis Pagan.  The Yolandita new single “Mala”, was released on October 6, 2008 on national radio.

Music video
For this video, Yolandita had to be like his song "Mala". Before the world premiere of the video, Yolandita was giving interviews, while recording it, the television network with more reports on this video recording was Univision / Telefutura. But with this, the world premiere of the music video was for the Program of Telemundo Puerto Rico, "No Te Duermas" and was a success. The first part of the music video has a strong vocabulary, so they had to cut the voice, as Yolandita saying words like, "Mierda" and "Hijo de P...". With this, she had all expectations of the success of the single. Portions of the video, was to Monge, with several dancers, were filmed several scenes Yolandita in a bathroom next to a man who is assumed to be deceived (in the fabric of the song). Also at the end of the video, she is giving a concert in a "club", all this with a leather clothes and chains embedded in clothing, making their image "Mala".

New versions
Reggaeton and Tropical Official Remix

Yolandita Monge, began to record the official versions or "remix" of her first single in promotion "Mala", her new album, which bears the same name.  The single, recorded in that version "reggaeton", will do next to the Puerto Rican reggaetón singer Ivy Queen, and this will be produced by the rappers, Luny Tunes.

In addition, Monge will save the tropical version of this theme, along with the Puerto Rican singer, "La India", this is the first duo that Yolandita makes along this singer.

Release history

Charts

References

External links
 Facebook.com - Yolandita Monge Facebook Page
 YolanditaMonge.net - La Eterna Diva Spanish Fansite.*
 YolanditaMonge.com - Spanish Fansite

2008 singles
Ivy Queen songs
La India songs
Song recordings produced by Luny Tunes
2008 songs

es:Yolandita Monge